Hiraku Nakajima (Japanese: 中島 啓 Nakajima Hiraku; born November 30, 1962) is a Japanese mathematician, and a professor of the Kavli Institute for the Physics and Mathematics of the Universe at the University of Tokyo. He will be International Mathematical Union president for the 2023–2026 term. 

He obtained his Ph.D. from the University of Tokyo in 1991. In 2002 he was plenary speaker at the International Congress of Mathematicians in Beijing. He won the 2003 Cole Prize in algebra for his work on representation theory and geometry. He proved Nekrasov's conjecture.

Biography
 1985 - BA from the University of Tokyo
 1987 - MA from the University of Tokyo, and became a research associate at the University of Tokyo
 1991 - PhD from the University of Tokyo
 1992 - Associate professor at Tohoku University
 1995 - Associate professor at the University of Tokyo
 1997 - Associate professor at Kyoto University
 2000 - Full professor at Kyoto University
 2018 - Full professor at Kavli Institute for the Physics and Mathematics of the Universe

Awards and prizes
 1997 - Geometry Prize of the Mathematical Society of Japan
 2000 - Spring Prize of the Mathematical Society of Japan
 2003 - Cole Prize in algebra of the American Mathematical Society
 2005 - JSPS prize of the Japan Society for the Promotion of Science
 2014 - Japan Academy Prize

Notable publications
Shigetoshi Bando, Atsushi Kasue, and Hiraku Nakajima. On a construction of coordinates at infinity on manifolds with fast curvature decay and maximal volume growth.  Invent. Math. 97 (1989), no. 2, 313–349.  
Hiraku Nakajima. Instantons on ALE spaces, quiver varieties, and Kac-Moody algebras. Duke Math. J. 76 (1994), no. 2, 365–416.  
Hiraku Nakajima. Heisenberg algebra and Hilbert schemes of points on projective surfaces. Ann. of Math. (2) 145 (1997), no. 2, 379–388.  ,  
Hiraku Nakajima. Quiver varieties and Kac-Moody algebras. Duke Math. J. 91 (1998), no. 3, 515–560.  
Hiraku Nakajima. Quiver varieties and finite-dimensional representations of quantum affine algebras. J. Amer. Math. Soc. 14 (2001), no. 1, 145–238.

External links
 Nakajima's homepage
 

1962 births
Living people
People from Tokyo
20th-century Japanese mathematicians
21st-century Japanese mathematicians
Institute for Advanced Study visiting scholars
Azabu High School alumni
University of Tokyo alumni
Academic staff of Tohoku University
Academic staff of the University of Tokyo
Academic staff of Kyoto University
Presidents of the International Mathematical Union